Deirdre Donnelly is an Irish actress, based in Dublin who works in television, films and theatre.

Donnelly was a member of the Abbey Theatre Company for several years before leaving to work on the television series The Riordans.  She appeared in 58 episodes of the television series Ballykissangel, from 1996 to 2001.

Early life 
Donnelly is the third of four daughters. Her father was from Rathfarnham, Co. Dublin and her mother from Castleblaney, Co. Monaghan. Her sister Terry Donnelly is also an actress.

Donnelly grew up in Cullenswood House, Ranelagh, and was educated at Mount St. Anne's School in Milltown, South Dublin. She studied for two years at the Brendan Smith Theatre Academy and a further two years at the Abbey Theatre School of Acting.

In 2004, Donnelly completed postgraduate studies at UCD, receiving a first-class master's degree in Modern Drama Studies.

Stage roles 

 Rosalind in Shakespeare's As You Like It at the Gaiety Theatre, Dublin and on national tour with the Irish Theatre Company, 
 Olivia in Twelfth Night at the Abbey's Peacock Theatre.
 The Bride in Lorca's Blood Wedding at the Abbey 
 Kate Hardcastle in She Stoops to Conquer with the Irish Theatre Company.
 Boesman and Lena for Field Day Theatre Company at the Guildhall in Derry
 The Mouth in Beckett's Not I at the Peacock.
 Jon Fosse's A Dream of Autumn at the Project Theatre, Dublin She received an Irish Times Best Supporting Actress nomination
 Nuts and Bolts in Bewley's Cafe Theatre, Dublin 
 Linda Loman  Death of a Salesman at the Gate Theatre, Dublin. 
 Lady Catherine de Burgh in Pride and Prejudice at the Hong Kong Arts Festival
 Lady Bracknell in The Importance of Being Earnest at the Spoleto Arts Festival in South Carolina.
 Monagh in Catchpenny Twist  at the Peacock Theatre, 
 Tiny Tina in John, Paul, George, Ringo...and Bert for the ITC
 Roscommon in The Blue Macushla at the Abbey Theatre,
 Christina Daftigan in The J. Arthur Maginnis Story with the Irish Theatre Company, 
 Magdalene in Frank McGuinness's Donegal, also at the Abbey
 Evening Train at the Everyman Palace Theatre. Cork.

Film and television roles 

 The Riordans (1974 - TV Series - RTE) as Cathy.
 The Last of Summer (1978 - TV Series - RTE) as Jo.
 Farmers (1978 - TV Drama - RTE) as Nuala.
 Miracles and Miss Langan (1979 - TV Drama - RTE) as Miss Langan.
 Criminal Conversation (1981 - Feature Film - BAC Films) as Margaret.
 Painted Out (1982 - TV Drama - RTE) as Maura Doyle.
 Attracta (1983 - Feature Film - BAC Films) as Geraldine Carey.
 The Irish RM (1984-85 - TV Series - RTE/Channel 4) as Miss Fraser.
 The Fantasist (1986 - Feature Film - ITC Films) as Fionnuala O'Sullivan.
 Molloy (1989 - TV Series - RTE) as Mrs. Molloy.
 Connemara (aka La Rouge) (1990 - Feature Film - Lapaca Films) as La Reine.
 The Hamster Wheel (1993 - TV Drama - BBC NI) as Jeanette.
 Runway One (1995 - V Drama - BBC) as Mrs. Connaughton.
 Ballykissangel (1996-2001 - TV Series - World Productions/BBC) as Siobhan.
 Legend (2006 - TV Series - RTE) as Bernie Molloy.
 The Clinic (2006-07 - TV Series - RTE) as Carol O'Dwyer.
 Cracks (2009 - Feature Film - Scott Free/Element Pictures) as Miss Lacey.
 Homemade (2012 - Short Film - Park Films) as Joan.
 Quirke (2014 - TV Series - BBC/RTE) as Sister Dominic.
 Amber (2015 - TV Series - RTE) as Maureen O'Donoghue.
 The Frankenstein Chronicles (2015 - TV Series - ITV) as Mrs. Townsend.
 Goodbye, Darling (2016 - Short Film - Fantastic Films) as Kathleen.
 Striking Out (2017 - TV Series - Blinder Films/RTE) - as Judge O'Sullivan.
 The Lonely Battle of Thomas Reid (2018 - Feature Film - Park Films) as Supreme Court Judge.
 The Virtues (2019 - TV Series - Warp Films/Channel 4) as Susan.
 Rialto (2019 - TV Series - Marcie Films) as Miriam.
 The Ferry (2019 - Short Film - Media Factory) as Bertha.
 Brassic (2019 - TV Series - Calamity Films/ Sky 1) as Mo Dennings.
 The Lady on the Hill (aka The Bog Lady) (2019 - Short Film - Red Spider Films) as The Mother.

References

External links 
 

Living people
Irish film actresses
Irish stage actresses
Year of birth missing (living people)